Oak Ridge Cemetery is an American cemetery in Springfield, Illinois.

The Lincoln Tomb, where Abraham Lincoln, his wife and all but one of their children lie, is here, as are the graves of other prominent Illinois figures. Opened in 1860, it was the third and is now the only public cemetery in Springfield, after the City Cemetery and Hutchinson.

The cemetery was designed by William Saunders in the Rural Cemetery Landscape Lawn style. The location was chosen for its topography, including rolling hills, key to this style. The many eponymous oak trees cover a ridge bordering low-lying Spring Creek, a landscape unusual in central Illinois. The newest, southwest section opened after 1945. Its design follows the Memorial Park style, in which roadways are wide enough for motor vehicles.

Oak Ridge has a Korean War memorial, the World War II Illinois Veterans Memorial and the Illinois Vietnam Veterans Memorial. The Springfield and Central Illinois African-American History Museum is adjacent.

Notable burials
 William Henry Bissell
 Jacob Bunn
 John Whitfield Bunn
 Daniel Pope Cook
 John Cook
 Shelby Moore Cullom
 Jesse K. Dubois
 Ninian Edwards, only governor of the Illinois Territory
 William Lee D. Ewing
 Nellie Grant – daughter of President Ulysses S. Grant
 William Herndon
 Elijah Iles
 William Jayne
 John L. Lewis – President of the United Mine Workers from 1919 to 1960
 Abraham Lincoln – sixteenth President of the United States during the Civil War
 Mary Todd Lincoln – Abraham's wife
 Fleetwood Lindley – the last person to have looked upon Lincoln's face in September 1901
 Vachel Lindsay
 John Alexander McClernand
 Alfred Orendorff
 John Carroll Power – first custodian of Lincoln's Tomb
 Alexander Starne – Illinois Secretary of State and Illinois Treasurer
 John T. Stuart – U.S. Congressman, lawyer, law partner of Abraham Lincoln
 John Riley Tanner
 Arthur Harrison Wilson (Medal of Honor)

Gallery

References

External links

 Illinois Ancestors – Oak Ridge Cemetery
 Oak Ridge Cemetery – City of Springfield
 Graveyards.com – photos
 

Cemeteries in Illinois
Cemeteries on the National Register of Historic Places in Illinois
Monuments and memorials in Illinois
National Register of Historic Places in Springfield, Illinois
Tourist attractions in Springfield, Illinois
Abraham Lincoln
Historic districts on the National Register of Historic Places in Illinois
Rural cemeteries
Tombs of presidents of the United States